The Bounty Trough is a major submerged feature, a bathymetric depression, of the oceanography of the southwest Pacific Ocean. It is located off the east coast of New Zealand's South Island. It is named after the Bounty Islands near the Eastern end of the trough. The islands, in turn, are named after .

Extent 
The Bounty Trough is located to the South of the Chatham Rise, and North of the Campbell Plateau.

Geology 
A curious feature of the Bounty Trough is that it marks the continuation of several main river features in the South Island – the "Otago Fan Complex". This is a distinct series of channels existing in the base of the trough which is an extension of the Clutha and Waitaki River systems.

Both these rivers, especially the Clutha, are noted for their fast flow. This alone would not account for the existence of the channels, though much of their current contours was probably shaped by sediment during the ice ages.

The channel system is the remnant of a Cretaceous (failed) rift formed via ocean-floor spreading at the time when Zealandia separated from Antarctica between 130 and 85 Mya. The channels provide a major transportation system for sediments from the major rivers in the eastern South Island. At the Eastern end of the rift is the abyssal Bounty Fan.

In July 2012, the NIWA research ship  mapped the area finding a structure of nine canyons ending in "a large deep apron-shaped sediment deposit in the Bounty Trough". The survey considered development of a biodiversity assessment of the area which would then support "potential environmental effects of any oil drilling, and help establish environmental guidelines specific to the area". The survey could support petrochemical exploration, though, Roberts et al. found evidence of "an extensive and effective petroleum system" to be "conjectural".

Both the Otago and abyssal fans, and the rift itself developed from the Kaikoura Orogeny and were greatly accelerated after about 2.5 Ma, with the onset of global glacial/interglacial climatic cycles and the development of an icecap along the alpine region of South Island. The glacial periods contributed large amounts of sediment to the trough. Sediment is not being deposited now in the same way as it was during the glacial period.

References

Geography of the New Zealand seabed
Zealandia